Pierre François Michelle Eugène Giraud (August 8, 1806 – December 28, 1881) was a French painter and engraver. He painted one of the best known portraits of writer Gustave Flaubert. He won many awards and honors in recognition for his work.

Visite aux Ateliers L'Illustration Journal Universel No. 384 Vol XVI (French)

Notable works

 Danse dans une Posada à Granada, (1852)
 Jeunette dansant au Caire, (1866) et, (1869)
 Matador mortellement blessé
 Femmes d'Alger
 Caricature of mes couilles Jules-Émile Saintin, between 1865 and 2895, watercolor, Bibliothèque nationale de France
 Le Départ de l'armée de Condé ?, (1873),
 Le Présentateur de bijou au harem, (1874),
 Le shop, (1875),
 Le Marché aux fleurs sous le Directoire, (1876).

19th-century French painters
French male painters
1806 births
1881 deaths
Prix de Rome for engraving
19th-century French male artists